Christ Be Glorified is the second studio album from American contemporary worship music band BridgeCity. The album was released on February 3, 2015 under Maranatha! Music and distributed by Capitol Christian Distribution.

The album was debuted live and advertised through the annual Generation Unleashed youth conference in late January and early February, 2015 (located in Portland, Oregon).

Track listing

Notes
New verses on track 4 by Marcus Janzen, Jeremy Scott, and Isaac Tarter.
New verses on track 11 by Julia Damazio and Isaac Tarter.

Personnel
BridgeCity
Jeremy Scott - lead vocals (1, 2, 4, 5, 9, 10, 12), acoustic guitar, executive producer
Kim-Maree Janzen - lead vocals (3, 5), backing vocals
Adam Smucker - lead vocals (6, 8), acoustic guitar
Hannah Hategan - lead vocals (7)
Isaac Tarter - lead vocals (11), keyboards
Yasuhito Hontani - electric guitar
Gabriel Adams - electric guitar
Brandon Bee - slide guitar, tambourine, producer
Jenny Civis - keyboards
Nathan Scott - drums
Joe Garibay - drums
Jay Sudarma - drums

Gang vocals
Isaac Tarter, Katrina Tarter, Marcus Janzen, Kim-Maree Janzen, Clint Guevara, Ethan Ebersole, Tyler Fitch, Jarius Trelenberg, Alex Damian, Narcis Damian, Jeff Borota, Jessica Borota, Nathan Ganz
Additional production
Brian Lawrence - engineering
David Benton - engineering
Mine Bae - engineering
Craig Alvin - mixing
Shelley Anderson - mastering
Jay Sundarma - graphic design

Notes
The band is based out of City Bible Church in Portland, Oregon and has been around since 1993 in the form of the worship band for the annual youth conference: Generation Unleashed.  The group has previously released multiple live albums under the Generation Unleashed namesake.
Though the album was available globally on February 3, 2015, those who attended the first week of the 2015 Generation Unleashed conference in late January were able to acquire the album physically almost a week early.
As shown by a few professional music sites, there was an early discrepancy on the album's track listing regarding order and names of the songs.

References

External links
BridgeCity website
Generation Unleashed website
City Bible Church website

Contemporary Christian music albums by American artists
2015 albums